Lê Văn Xuân (born 27 February  1999) is a Vietnamese professional footballer who plays as a full-back for Hà Nội and the Vietnam national team.

International goals

U-23

Honours
Hồng Lĩnh Hà Tĩnh
V.League 2: Runner-up 2018 
Hà Nội
V.League 1: 2022; Runner-up 2020  
Vietnamese National Cup: 2020
Vietnamese Super Cup: 2020, 2021
Vietnam U23
Southeast Asian Games: 2021

References

External links
 

Living people
Vietnamese footballers
Association football midfielders
V.League 1 players
Hanoi FC players
1999 births
People from Thanh Hóa province
Competitors at the 2021 Southeast Asian Games
Southeast Asian Games competitors for Vietnam